Atamanovka is a rural locality (a selo) in Kirzinsky Selsoviet, Karaidelsky District, Bashkortostan, Russia. The population was 104 as of 2010. There are 5 streets.

Geography 
Atamanovka is located 57 km southwest of Karaidel (the district's administrative centre) by road. Khoroshayevo is the nearest rural locality.

References 

Rural localities in Karaidelsky District